KCWJ (1030 AM) is a radio station in the Blue Springs/Kansas City, Missouri, market.  It is owned by Radio Vida Kansas.  It is a 5,000 watt day/500 watt night station.

History
KCWJ signed on in 1984 as KBST, an Adult Contemporary station that later switched to oldies, then back to adult contemporary.  In 1989, the station became an affiliate of the Z-Rock network.  After stints with talk and classic country, the station began its Christian music format in 1999.  The style of the music changed over the years from contemporary Christian to more traditional Christian music mixing hymns, southern gospel, bluegrass, and choirs.

As Classic Country 1030, the station also served as an affiliate for UMKC Kangaroos basketball, Blue Springs High School Wildcats football, Blue Springs South High School Jaguars football, as well as an affiliate for Missouri State University Athletics and St. Louis Blues hockey. Following the format change in 2021, the future of any of these affiliations is unclear.

In February 2016, KCWJ changed their format from southern gospel to classic country, branded as "Real Country 1030".

In August 2021, KCWJ was sold to Radio Vida Kansas for a disclosed price of $425,000. The format changed to Spanish at the time of the sale, which closed on August 16. The station announced on their Facebook page on August 18 that the previous owners, Slayton Communications, had decided to retire.

References

External links

Jackson County, Missouri
CWJ
CWJ
CWJ